Wiktor Tomczak (born 22 July 2002) is a Polish handball player for Torus Wybrzeże Gdańsk on loan from Industria Kielce and the Polish national team.

References

2002 births
Living people
Sportspeople from Wrocław
Vive Kielce players
Polish male handball players